Candlelight Farms Airport  is a privately-owned, public use airfield located in New Milford, Connecticut, United States.

Facilities and aircraft
Candlelight Farms Airport is situated 3 miles southwest of the central business district, and contains one runway and helipad.  The runway is turf measuring 2,900 x 50 ft (884 x 15 m). 

For the 12-month period ending April 30, 2010, the airport had 10,950 aircraft operations, an average of 30 per day: 86% local general aviation, and 14% transient general aviation. At that time there were 14 aircraft based at this airport: 100% single-engine.

Accidents and incidents

 On the morning of August 11, 2017, a Cessna 172 carrying a pilot and two passengers crashed, killing one person.

References

External links
 
Candlelight Farms website, retrieved July 2021

Airports in Connecticut
New Milford, Connecticut
Transportation buildings and structures in Litchfield County, Connecticut